The 2023 Major League Baseball postseason is the upcoming postseason tournament of Major League Baseball (MLB) for the 2023 season. The winners of the Wild Card Series would move on to face the top two seeds of each respective league in the League Division Series, and the victors would move on to the League Championship Series to determine the pennant winners that face each other in the World Series.

The 2023 postseason is expected to begin on October 3, 2023.

References

External links
 Major League Baseball Standings and Expanded Standings – 2023

 
Major League Baseball postseason